Flókadalur can refer to two places in Iceland:

Flókadal in Borgarfjarðarsýsla
Flókadal in Skagafjarðarsýsla